The volleyball tournaments at the 2022 Mediterranean Games in Oran will take place between 26 June and 4 July 2022.

Medal summary

Events

Medal table

Participating nations

Men

Women

References

External links
Official site
Results book

Sports at the 2022 Mediterranean Games
2018
Mediterranean Games
Mediterranean Games